The following is a list of drum corps. A junior corps is any corps restricted to members age 22 and under, while a senior corps (also known as an all-age corps) does not have any such age requirement.

Junior corps

Senior corps

Military corps

See also 
 List of Drum Corps International member corps
 List of defunct Drum Corps International member corps
 List of Drum Corps Associates member corps

External links 

 List of Drum Corps compiled by the DCX Museum

Drum corps